Astathes japonica is a species of beetle in the family Cerambycidae. It was described by J. Thomson in 1857. It is known from Borneo and the Philippines.

References

J
Beetles described in 1857